Food and Catering (Ships' Crews) Convention, 1946 is  an International Labour Organization Convention.

It was established in 1946, with the preamble stating:
Having decided upon the adoption of certain proposals with regard to food and catering for crews on board ship,...

Ratifications 
As of 2013, the convention has been ratified by 25 states. Of the ratifying states, 19 have subsequently denounced the treaty.

External links 
Text.
Ratifications.

International Labour Organization conventions
Treaties concluded in 1946
Treaties entered into force in 1957
Treaties of Algeria
Treaties of the People's Republic of Angola
Treaties of Argentina
Treaties of Belgium
Treaties of Egypt
Treaties of Equatorial Guinea
Treaties of Guinea-Bissau
Treaties of Ireland
Treaties of Italy
Treaties of New Zealand
Treaties of Panama
Treaties of Peru
Treaties of the Estado Novo (Portugal)
Treaties of Turkey
Treaties of the United Kingdom
Treaties of Romania
Admiralty law treaties
Catering
Food treaties
Treaties extended to French Guiana
Treaties extended to Guadeloupe
Treaties extended to Martinique
Treaties extended to Réunion
1946 in labor relations